Davis is a common English-language surname shared by many notable people.

People with the surname Davis

A
Aasha Davis (born 1973), American actress
Abel Davis (1874–1937), American officer
Abraham Hopkins Davis (1796–1866), Australian businessman
Abraham Lincoln Davis (1914–1978), American minister
Addie Elizabeth Davis (1917–2005), American religious leader
Adelle Davis (1904–1974), American nutritionist
Aidan Davis (born 1997), English rapper
Aidon Davis (born 1994), South African rugby union footballer
Aine Davis (born 1984), British criminal
Alana Davis (born 1974), American singer-songwriter
Albert Davis (baseball), American baseball player
Alfonza W. Davis (1919–1944), American aviator
Alicia Boler Davis, American business executive
Alistair Davis (born 1992), South African sports shooter
Alonzo Davis (born 1942), American artist
Altovise Davis (1943–2009), American dancer
Alvin Davis (born 1960), American baseball player
Ambrose Davis (1863–1909), American baseball player
Amos Davis (1794–1835), American politician
Andra Davis (born 1978), American football player
Angela Davis (born 1944), American political activist
Anna Davis (born 2006), American golfer
Anne-Christine Davis, British physicist
Annett Davis (born 1973), American volleyball player
Antoine Davis (born 1998), American basketball player
Antone Davis (born 1967), American football player
Antonio Davis (born 1968), American basketball player
Antonio Davis (boxer) (born 1972), American boxer
A. Porter Davis (1890–1970), American physician
Ariel Alexandria Davis, American actress
Arlene Davis (1910–1964), American aviator
Arnold Davis (born 1938), American football player
Arrie W. Davis (born 1940), American lawyer
Arron Davis (born 1972), English footballer
Artur Davis (born 1967), American politician
Ashlan Davis (born 1983), American football player
Ashtyn Davis (born 1996), American football player
Aubrey Davis (1921–1996), American basketball player
Augustus P. Davis (1835–1899), American army officer
A. W. Davis (1943–2014), American basketball player and coach

B
Babe Davis, American baseball player
Bancroft Davis (1822–1907), American lawyer and diplomat
Barbara Davis, American social figure
Barbara Anne Davis (1930–2008), American baseball player
Baron Davis (born 1979), American basketball player
B. B. Davis (born 1960), American basketball player
Beatrice Deloitte Davis (1909–1992), Australian editor
Belinda Davis (born 1959), American historian
Belle Davis (1874–1938), American choreographer
Belva Davis (born 1932), American journalist
Bennie L. Davis (1928–2012), American general
Benny Davis (1895–1979), American performer
Bergen Davis (1869–1958), American physicist
Beryl Davis (1924–2011), British-American vocalist
Bette Davis (1908–1989), American actress
Betty Davis (1944–2022), American singer-songwriter
Bettye Davis (1938–2018), American politician
Beulah Parson Davis (1896–1943), American fortune teller
Beverly A. Davis (1866–1944), American politician
Beverley Davis (born 1957), American golfer
Blevins Davis (1903–1971), American playwright
Bliss N. Davis (1901–1885), American politician
Bo Davis (born 1970), American football coach
Bonnie Davis (1920–1976), American singer
Bradley Moore Davis (1871–1957), American botanist
Brandon Davis (born 1990), American mixed martial artist
Brandy Davis (1927–2005), American baseball player
Breanne Davis, American politician
Brendon Davis (born 1997), American baseball player
Brett Davis (born 1975), American politician
Brett Davis (comedian), American comedian
Brianne Davis, American actress
Brinton B. Davis (1862–1952), American architect
Brock Davis (born 1943), American baseball player
Bud Davis (1895–1967), American baseball player
Bunch Davis, American baseball player
Burr Davis (born 1937), Canadian football player
Byron Davis (born 1973), Australian squash player and coach

C
Cade Davis (born 1988), American basketball player
Caleb Davis (1738–1797), American merchant
Carlton Davis (born 1996), American football player
Carlton "Santa" Davis (born 1953), Jamaican musician                     
Carlene Davis (born 1953), Jamaican Gospel Singer
Carole Davis (born 1958), English actress
Caroline Davis (publishing), British academic
Caroline Davis (saxophonist) (born 1981), American saxophonist
Carrie Davis (born 1976), English television presenter
Carrie Chase Davis (1863–1953), American physician
Cassi Davis (born 1964), American actress
Cassidy Davis (born 1994), Australian footballer
Cassie Davis (born 1987), Australian singer-songwriter
CeDell Davis (1926–2017), American guitarist
Catherine Davis (1924–2002), American poet
Cathy Davis (born 1959), American boxer
Chandler Davis (1926–2022), American mathematician
Chandra Davis (born 1978), American model
Chauncey Davis (born 1983), American football player
Chauncey Davis (politician) (1812–1888), American politician
Chester R. Davis (1896–1966), American businessman
Chili Davis (born 1960), Jamaican-American baseball player
Chip Davis (born 1947), American musician
Christian Davis (born 1992), English cricketer
Christine Davis (born 1962), Canadian artist
Cindy Davis (born 1977), American motocross racer
C. J. Davis (born 1987), American football player
C. J. Davis (wide receiver) (born 1969), American football player
Clarence Davis (born 1949), American football player
Clarence "Tiger" Davis (born 1942), American politician
Clarissa Davis (born 1967), American basketball player
Claud M. Davis (1924–2020), American engineer and inventor
Claude Davis (born 1979), Jamaican footballer
Claude Davis (American football) (born 1989), American football player
Clifton Davis (born 1945), American actor
Clyde Brion Davis (1894–1962), American author
Cody Davis (born 1989), American football player
Cole Davis (born 1997), Canadian rugby union footballer
Connor Davis (born 1994), American football player
Corbett Davis (1914–1968), American football player
Corneal A. Davis (1900–1995), American politician
Cornelia Cassady Davis (1870–1920), American painter
Country Davis, American baseball player
Crispin Davis (born 1949), British businessman
Curt Davis (1903–1965), American baseball player
Cushman Kellogg Davis (1838–1900), American politician
Cynthia Davis (born 1959), American politician
Cyprian Davis (1930–2015), American priest
Cyrus W. Davis (1856–1917), American politician

D
Dafydd Davis, Welsh biker
Dain Davis (born 1995), Indian actor
Daisy Davis (1858–1902), American baseball player
Dalton Davis (born 1990), South African rugby union footballer
Damon Davis (born 1985), American artist
Dána-Ain Davis, American professor
Dane Davis, American sound editor
Dantrell Davis (1985–1992), American victim of gang fighting
Darnell Davis (born 1975), American musician
Darrell Davis (born 1968), American football player
Darwin Davis (born 1993), American basketball player
Davion Davis (born 1997), American football player
Davonte Davis (born 2001), American basketball player
Dean Davis (born 1972), American politician
Deane C. Davis (1900–1990), American politician
Debbie McCune Davis (born 1951), American politician
Debra Davis (born 1959), American politician
Dedra Davis (born 1973), Bahamian athlete
Dee Dee Davis (born 1996), American actress
Deirdre Davis (born 1963), British actress
Delano Davis (born 1995), Bahamian sprinter
Delbert Davis (1883–1965), American poet
Delbert Dwight Davis (1908–1965), American anatomist 
Delores Ivory Davis, American soprano
Delos Davis (1846–1915), Canadian lawyer
DeRay Davis, American comedian
Dereck E. Davis (born 1967), American politician
Derius Davis (born 2000), American football player
Deshaun Davis (born 1996), American football player
Desmond Davis (1926–2021), British actor
Devante Davis (born 1992), American football player
Devra Davis (born 1946), American epidemiologist
Dexter Davis (born 1986), American football player
Dexter Davis (defensive back) (born 1970), American football player
Diana Davis (born 2003), American-Russian ice dancer
Dixie Davis (1905–1969), American lawyer
Dixie Davis (baseball) (1890–1944), American baseball player
D. J. Davis (baseball) (born 1994), American baseball player
D'Mitch Davis (born 1941), American actor
Dolor Davis (1593–1673), American priest
Domenique Davis (born 1996), American football player
Dominique Davis (born 1989), American football player
Donn Davis, American venture capitalist
Donna P. Davis, American physician
Donnie Davis (born 1972), American football player
Dorathea Davis (1951–2005), American politician
Doris A. Davis (born 1935), American politician
Dorland J. Davis (1911–1990), American physician
Dorsett Davis (born 1979), American football player
Drew Davis (born 1989), American football player
Drexell R. Davis (1921–2009), American politician
Duane Davis, American actor
Duane "Keefe D" Davis (born 1963), American gang member
Dunbar Davis (1843–1923), American military officer
D. W. Davis (1873–1959), American politician

E
Earl Davis, American baseball player
Earl A. Davis (1890–??), American football player
Edna Davis (1907–1989), Australian entertainer
Eduardo Tejeira Davis (1951–2016), Panamanian architect
Edwards Davis (1873–1936), American actor
Eisa Davis (born 1971), American playwright
Elaine Davis (born 1976), Jamaican netball player
Eldon Davis (1917–2011), American architect
Eleanor Davis (born 1983), American cartoonist
Eleanor Layfield Davis (1911–1985), American painter
Elgin Davis (born 1965), American football player
Eliot Davis (1871–1954), New Zealand politician
Elise Davis, American musician
Eliza Davis (1866–1931), English columnist
Eliza Davis (letter writer) (1817–1903), English letter writer
Ellabelle Davis (1907–1960), American singer
Elma Davis (1968–2019), South African lawn bowler
Elmer Davis (1890–1958), American news reporter
Emanual Davis (born 1968), American basketball player
Emanuel Davis (born 1989), American football player
Emilie Davis (1839–1889), American writer
Emma Davis (born 1983), Irish triathlete
Emma Lu Davis (1905–1988), American sculptor
Enoch Douglas Davis (1908–1995), American writer
Eoin Davis (born 2000), Irish hurler
Erik Davis (born 1967), American writer
Erik Davis (baseball) (born 1986), American baseball player
Erin Davis, Canadian radio personality
Erin Davis (politician), American politician
Ernie Davis (1939–1963), American football player
Ernest Davis (brewer) (1872–1962), New Zealand brewer and politician
Erroll Davis (born 1944), American businessman
Essie Davis (born 1970), Australian actress
Eunice Davis (1800–1901), American abolitionist
Everard Davis (1912–2005), English sprinter
Ewin L. Davis (1876–1949), American politician

F
F. A. Davis (1850–1917), American publisher
Fabian Davis (born 1974), Jamaican footballer
Fay Davis (1872–1945), American actress
Fay E. Davis (1916–1997), American artist
Florence A. Davis, American entrepreneur
Floyd Davis (1909–1977), American stock car racing driver
Floyd MacMillan Davis (1896–1966), American painter
Forest Davis (1879–1959), American politician
Frances Davis (1882–1965), American nurse
Frances Taylor Davis (1929–2018), American dancer
Frenchie Davis (born 1979), American singer

G
Gabe Davis (born 1999), American football player
Gabrielle Davis (born 1941), British sheriff
Gail Davis (1925–1997), American actress
Gains Davis (1913–1983), American football player
Galen Davis (1951–2005), American politician
Gareth Davis (born 1950), British businessman
Garrett Davis (1801–1872), American politician
Garrick Davis (born 1971), American poet
Garry Davis (1921–2013), American activist
Garth Davis, Australian film director
Garth Davis (surgeon) (born 1970), American surgeon
Gavin Davis (born 1977), South African politician
Geater Davis (1946–1984), American singer-songwriter
Geena Davis (born 1956), American actress
Geffrey Davis (born 1983), American poet
Georgia Davis (born 1999), English cricketer
Georgia-May Davis (born 1995), Australian actress
Georgiann Davis, American sociologist
Georgie Davis (born 1969), Dutch singer
Georgina A. Davis (1852–1901), American illustrator
Gerard Davis (born 1977), New Zealand footballer
Geremy Davis (born 1992), American football player
Gervonta Davis (born 1994), American boxer
Gherardi Davis (1858–1941), American politician
Girvies Davis (1958–1995), American serial killer
G. Lindsey Davis (born 1948), American bishop
Glyn Davis (born 1959), Australian academic administrator
Glynn Davis (born 1991), American baseball player
Goldie Davis, American baseball player
Gordon Davis (born 1941), American lawyer
Grace Montañez Davis (1926–2020), American politician
Graham Davis (born 1953), Fijian-Australian journalist
Graham Davis (racing driver), British racing driver
Grahame Davis, New Zealand footballer
Gray Davis (born 1942), American politician
Greg Tarzan Davis (born 1993), American actor
Gronow Davis (1828–1891), British general
Gussie Davis (1863–1899), American songwriter
Gussie Nell Davis (1906–1993), American teacher
Gwen Davis (born 1936), American novelist
Gwenda Louise Davis (1911–1993), Australian botanist

H
H. A. Davis (1879–1946), American politician
Hal Davis (1933–1998), American songwriter
Hall Davis (born 1987), American football player
Harper Davis (1925–2020), American football player
Harrison Davis (born 1952), American football player
Hart Davis (1791–1854), British politician
Harvey Davis (born 1953), Australian rules footballer
Harvey N. Davis (1881–1952), American engineer
Harwell Goodwin Davis (1882–1977), American lawyer
Hasbrouck Davis (1827–1870), American general
Hayley Davis (born 1993), English golfer
Heath Davis (born 1971), New Zealand cricketer
Heather Davis (born 1974), Canadian rower
Helen Davis (1926–2015), American politician
Herman Davis (1888–1923), American soldier
Herndon Davis (1901–1962), American artist
Hester A. Davis (1930–2014), American archaeologist
H. G. Davis Jr. (1924–2004), American educator
Hilda Andrea Davis (1905–2001), American educator
H. L. Davis (1894–1960), American novelist and poet
Holland Archer Davis (1869–1955), American philatelist
Homer Davis, Jamaican politician
Hope Davis (born 1964), American actress
Hope Hale Davis (1903–2004), American columnist
Horace Davis (1831–1916), American politician
Horatio N. Davis (1812–1907), American politician
Horrie Davis (1889–1960), Australian cricketer
Houston Davis (1914–1987), American composer
Howell Davis (1690–1719), Welsh pirate

I
Ida May Davis (1857–??), American litterateur
Ike Davis (born 1987), American baseball player
Ike Davis (shortstop) (1895–1984), American baseball player
Ilan Davis, British biochemist
Ilus W. Davis (1917–1996), American politician
Iron Davis (1890–1961), American baseball player
Irving Davis (1896–1958), American soccer player
Irving Gilman Davis (1885–1939), American economist and educator
Irwin Davis, American athletic administrator
Ivan Davis (1932–2018), American pianist
Ivan Davis (politician) (1937–2020), Northern Ireland politician

J
Jacke Davis (1936–2021), American baseball player
Jalen Davis (born 1996), American football player
Jamal Davis II (born 1995), American football player
Jamar Davis (born 1984), American basketball player
Jamelia Davis (born 1981), British singer
Jamin Davis (born 1998), American football player
Jan Davis (born 1953), American astronaut
Janet Davis, Canadian politician
Jarrad Davis (born 1994), American football player
Jarret Davis (born 1989), Belizean footballer
Javaris Davis (born 1996), American football player
Jawill Davis (born 1995), American football player
Jay Davis (born 1970), American baseball player
Jaylin Davis (born 1994), American baseball player
J. C. Séamus Davis, Irish physicist
JD Davis (born 1973), Belgian musician
J. D. Davis (born 1993), American baseball player
Jeanette Davis, American microbiologist
Jeannemarie Devolites Davis (born 1956), American politician
Jean-Paul Davis (born 1972), Canadian ice hockey player
Jed Davis (born 1975), American musician
Jefferson Davis (1808–1889), President of the Confederate States
Jehu Davis (1738–1802), American politician
Jennifer Pharr Davis (born 1983), American hiker
Jenny L. Davis, American anthropologist
Jeral Davis (born 1984), American basketball player
Jeremiah Davis (1826–1910), American pioneer
Jeremy Davis (born 1985), American musician
Jess H. Davis (1906–1971), American academic administrator
Jessica Davis (born 1978), American rhythmic gymnast
Jessie Bartlett Davis (1860–1905), American singer
J. G. Davis, American football player
J. Gunnis Davis (1873–1937), British-American actor
Jill Davis (born 1966), American author
Jill Davis (tennis) (born 1960), American tennis player
Jimmie Davis (1899–2000), American singer and politician
J. J. Davis (born 1978), American baseball player
J. L. Davis (1874–??), Irish rugby union footballer
J. Mac Davis (born 1952), American lawyer
Jo Ann Davis (1950–2007), American politician
Joan Davis (1907–1961), American actress
Joan Davis (cricketer) (1911–2004), Welsh cricketer
Joel Davis (born 1965), American baseball player
Joey Davis (born 1993), American mixed martial artist
Jonas Davis (1859–1911), Australian cricketer
Jose Davis (born 1978), American football player
Josie Davis (born 1973), American actress
Joslyn Davis (born 1982), American television host
J. P. Davis (1900–??), American screenwriter
J. R. Davis (1882–1947), American football player
J. Steward Davis (1890–1929), American lawyer and activist
Judd Davis (born 1973), American football player
Judy Davis (born 1955), Australian actress
Julie Hirschfeld Davis (born 1975), American politician
Julienne Davis (born 1973), American actress
Jumbo Davis (1861–1921), American baseball player

K
Kalia Davis (born 1998), American football player
Kane Davis (born 1975), American baseball player
Kanorris Davis (born 1990), American football player
Karl Davis (1962–1987), American fashion designer
Karl Davis (actor) (1908–1977), American professional wrestler
Karlene Davis (born 1946), British medical executive
Katharine Bement Davis (1860–1935), American political reformer
Kathy Davis (born 1956), American politician
Kathy Davis (sociologist), American sociologist
Kay Davis (1920–2012), American singer
Keeley Davis (born 1976), American musician
Keeley Davis (rugby league) (born 2000), Australian rugby league footballer
Keenan Davis (born 1991), American football player
Keionta Davis (born 1994), American football player
Kellen Davis (born 1985), American football player
Kelly Davis (born 1958), Canadian ice hockey player
Kelly Davis (reporter), American reporter
Kelsey Davis (born 1987), American soccer player
Kendric Davis (born 1999), American basketball player
Keno Davis (born 1972), American basketball coach
Kentrail Davis (born 1988), American baseball player
Kenturah Davis, American artist
Kermit Davis (born 1959), American basketball coach
Kerry Davis (born 1962), English footballer
Kertus Davis (born 1981), American racing driver
Khalil Davis (born 1996), American football player
Khris Davis (born 1987), American baseball player
Kia Davis (born 1976), Liberian-American sprinter
Kingsley Davis (1908–1997), American sociologist
Kira Davis, American film producer
Kiri Davis, American filmmaker
Knile Davis (born 1991), American football player
Kris Davis (born 1980), Canadian musician
Kristin Davis (born 1965), American actress
Kristin M. Davis (born 1977), American prostitute
Krystal Davis, American musician
Kyra Davis (born 1972), American novelist

L
Lacy J. Davis, American writer
LaDeva Davis (1944–2022), American television personality
Lagueria Davis, American film director
Lance Davis (born 1976), American baseball player
Lance E. Davis (1928–2014), American economic historian
Lanny Davis (born 1945), American political operative
Lauren Davis (born 1993), American tennis player
Lauren B. Davis, Canadian writer
Laurence Davis (1930–1974), South African cricketer
Lavinia R. Davis (1909–1961), American author
L. Clifford Davis (born 1924), American attorney
Leanne Davis (born 1985), English cricketer
Legh Davis (born 1940), Australian politician
Legrome D. Davis (born 1952), American judge
Leigh Davis (1955–2009), New Zealand writer
Leighton I. Davis (1910–1995), American lieutenant general
Leland Davis, American baseball player
Lem Davis (1914–1970), American saxophonist
Lemuel Davis (born 1953), American software engineer
Len Davis (born 1964), American police officer
Lennard J. Davis, English professor
Leo Davis (born 1992), South African sailor
Lester Thomas Davis (1904–1952), American politician
Levi Davis (politician) (1808–1897), American lawyer and politician
Lexi Davis (born 1994), American softball coach
Lincoln Davis (born 1943), American politician 
Linda Davis (born 1962), American singer
Linda Mitchell Davis (born 1930), American cowgirl
Lindsey Davis (born 1949), British author
Linsey Davis, American journalist
Lionel Davis (born 1936), South African artist
Lloyd E. Davis (1899–1955), American farmer and politician
Lloyd Spencer Davis (born 1954), New Zealand author
Lockyer John Davis (1717–1791), English bookseller
Lorne Davis (1930–2007), Canadian ice hockey player
Lou Davis (1881–1961), American songwriter
Lucinda Davis (1848–1937), American slave
Lucinda Davis (actress), American actress
Lucius Davis (born 1970), American basketball player 
Lucy Davis (born 1973), British actress
Lucy Davis (equestrian) (born 1992), American equestrian
Lula J. Davis, American politician
Luther Davis (1916–2008), American writer
Luther Davis (American football), American football player
Lydia Davis (born 1947), American writer
Lydia Davis (Cook Islands writer) (1919–2000), British writer

M
Mac Davis (1942–2020), American singer-songwriter
Mackenzie Davis (born 1987), Canadian actress
Madeline Davis (1940–2021), American activist
Madi Davis (born 1999), American singer-songwriter
Madison Davis (1833–1902), American slave
Madlyn Davis (c.1899–unknown), American singer
Maggie Davis, British political figure
Major Davis (1882–1959), English cricketer
Mal Davis (born 1956), Canadian ice hockey player
Malcolm Davis (ornithologist) (1899–1977), American ornithologist
Malik Davis (born 1998), American football player
Mana Hira Davis, New Zealand stuntman
Manvel H. Davis (1891–1959), American politician
Mara Davis (born 1959), American radio personality
Marcus Davis (born 1973), American mixed martial artist
Marcus Davis (American football) (born 1989), American football player
Margaret Bryan Davis (born 1931), American palynologist
Margo Davis (born 1944), American photographer
Marguerite Davis (1887–1967), American biochemist
Marguerite Sawyer Hill Davis (??–1948), American socialite
Maria Ragland Davis (1959–2010), American biologist
Marianna Davis (born 1972), American politician
Marsh Davis, American politician
Marvin Davis (1925–2004), American businessman
Marvin Davis (Canadian football) (born 1952), American football player
Marybeth Davis (born 1952), American nurse and criminal
Masen Davis (born 1971), American activist
Mati Hlatshwayo Davis (born 1982), Zimbabwean-American physician
Mattie Belle Davis (1910–2004), American judge
Maura Davis, American singer
Maury Davis, American pastor
Max Davis (born 1950), New Zealand footballer 
Max Leroy Davis (born 1945), Australian bishop 
Maxwell Davis (1916–1970), American saxophonist
May Davis (1914–1995), English-New Zealand potter
Megan Davis (born 1975), Australian activist
Mel Davis (born 1950), American basketball player
Mel Davis (musician) (1931–2004), American musician
Melissa Davis, American voice actress
Melvin Lee Davis, American bass player
Mendel Jackson Davis (1942–2007), American attorney
Meredith Davis (born 1948), American educator
Meryl Davis (born 1987), American ice dancer
Michaela Angela Davis (born 1964), American writer
Mickey Davis (born 1950), American basketball player
Miguel Davis (born 1966), Costa Rican footballer
Mildred Davis (1901–1969), American actress
Mildred B. Davis, American novelist
Miles Davis (1926–1991), American trumpeter
Miles Dewey Davis Jr. (1898–1962), American dentist
Millie Davis (born 2006), Canadian actress
Milton Davis, American musician
Milton C. Davis, American lawyer
Minnie S. Davis (1835–1927), American author
Miriam Isabel Davis (1856–1927), English painter
Miss Davis (1726–1755), Irish singer
Mitch Davis, American film director
Moll Davis (1648–1708), English courtesan
Mollie C. Davis (1932–2021), American activist
Mollie Evelyn Moore Davis (1844–1909), American poet
Mo'ne Davis (born 2001), American baseball and softball player
Monique D. Davis (born 1936), American educator
Monnett Bain Davis (1893–1953), American diplomat
Monte Hill Davis (1932–2018), American pianist
Monti Davis (1958–2013), American basketball player
Moe Davis (born 1958), American colonel
Morgan Davis, Canadian musician
Morris Davis (composer) (1904–1968), Canadian composer
Morry Davis (1894–1985), British politician
Mortimer Davis (1866–1928), Canadian businessman
Mouse Davis (born 1932), American football player

N
Nellie Verrill Mighels Davis (1844–1945), American journalist
Nic Davis, American filmmaker
Nicholas Davis Jr. (1825–1875), American politician
Nicolaus Davis (1883–1967), Greek painter
Nicole Davis (born 1982), American volleyball player
Nigel Davis (born 1951), English politician
Niki Davis, New Zealand computer scientist
Noel Davis (1927–2002), British actor
Noel Denholm Davis (1876–1950), English artist
Noor Davis (born 1994), American football player
Nore Davis (born 1984), American comedian
Norma Davis (1905–1945), Australian poet

O
Odie Davis (born 1955), American baseball player
Olea Marion Davis (1899 – 1977), Canadian artist and craftsperson
Olena Kalytiak Davis (born 1963), American poet
Omolyn Davis (born 1987), Jamaican footballer
Oran B. Davis (1872–1960), Canadian politician
Orbert Davis (born 1960), American trumpeter
Ossie Davis (1917–2005), American actor
Otho Davis, American athletic trainer
Otis Davis (born 1932), American athlete
Otis Davis (baseball) (1920–2007), American baseball player
Owen Davis (1874–1956), American dramatist
Owen Davis Jr. (1907–1949), American actor

P
Padraic Davis (born 1975), Irish Gaelic footballer
Paige Davis (born 1969), American actress
Paris Davis (born 1939), American army officer
Parke H. Davis (1871–1934), American football player
Parker S. Davis (1863–1955), American politician
Paschall Davis (born 1969), American football player
Pat Davis (born 1956), American dancer
Patricia V. Davis (born 1956), American novelist
Patti Davis (born 1952), American actress
Paula Davis (born 1973), American politician
Paulina Kellogg Wright Davis (1813–1876), American activist
Peaches Davis (1905–1995), American baseball player
Peanuts Davis (1917–1952), American baseball player
Percival Davis, American author
Pernell Davis (born 1976), American football player
Philern Davis (born 1982), British Virgin Island cricketer
Phineas Davis (1792–1835), American inventor
Phyllis Davis (1940–2013), American actress
Preacher Davis, American baseball player

Q
Quack Davis, American baseball player
Quartney Davis (born 1998), American football player
Quinshad Davis (born 1994), American football player

R
Radric Davis, birth name of Gucci Mane, American rapper and record executive
Raekwon Davis (born 1997), American football player
Rainy Davis, American songwriter
Rajai Davis (born 1980), American baseball player
Randy Davis (born 1952), American politician
Randall William Davis (born 1952), American educator
Raphael Davis (born 1976), American mixed martial artist
Rashard Davis (born 1995), American football player
Rashied Davis (born 1979), American football player
Raven Davis (born 1975), American artist
Rece Davis (born 1965), American anchor
Redd Davis (1896–??), Canadian film director
Renn Davis (1928–1997), British colonial administrator
Rennia Davis (born 1999), American basketball player
Rennie Davis (1940–2021), American activist
Rex Davis (1890–1951), British soldier
Rex D. Davis (1924–2008), American police officer
R. H. C. Davis (1918–1991), British historian
Richie Davis (born 1945), American football player
Richie Davis (musician) (born 1957), American guitarist
Rick Davis (born 1958), American soccer player
Rick Davis (political consultant) (born 1957), American political consultant
Ricky Davis (born 1979), American basketball player
Ricky Davis (American football) (born 1953), American football player
Robbie Davis (born 1961), American jockey
Robin Davis (born 1956), American judge
Robin Davis (director) (born 1943), French film director
Rock Davis (1833–1904), Australian shipbuilder
Rodger Davis (born 1951), Australian golfer
Roen Davis (born 2004), Bahamian footballer
Roland Clark Davis (1902–1961), American psychologist
Roman Griffin Davis (born 2007), English actor
Romanzo E. Davis (1831–1908), American farmer
Romay Davis (born 1919), American soldier
Rookie Davis (born 1993), American baseball player
Rose May Davis (1894–1985), American chemist
Rosey Davis (born 1941), American football player
Rosey Davis (baseball) (1904–1968), American baseball player
Rowena Davis (born 1964/1965), New Zealand gymnast
Rowenna Davis (born 1985), English journalist
Rowland L. Davis (1871–1954), American judge
Rowland Robert Teape Davis (1807–1879), New Zealand labor reformer
Royden B. Davis (1923–2002), American academic administrator
Rufus Davis (born 1964), American activist

S
Sammi Davis (born 1964), British actress
Saul Davis (1901–1994), American baseball player
Scot Davis, American wrestling coach
Seth Davis (born 1970), American sportswriter
Seth Davis (musician) (born 1979), American drummer
Shaheed Davis (born 1994), American basketball player
Shane Davis, American comic book artist
Shane Davis (astrophysicist), American astrophysicist
Shani Davis (born 1982), American speed skater
Shardé M. Davis, American academic
Sharen Davis (born 1957), American costume designer
Shaun Davis, British bodybuilder
Shawn Davis (American football) (born 1997), American football player
Shayla Davis, American politician
Sheana Davis (born 1969), American cheesemaker
Shelley Davis (1952–2008), American attorney
Shelly Boshart Davis (born 1980), American politician
Shelton H. Davis (1942–2010), American anthropologist
Sheri-An Davis, English actress
Sherman Davis, American baseball player
Sid Davis (1916–2006), American film director
Skeeter Davis (1931–2004), American singer
Sol Davis (born 1979), English footballer
Spanky Davis (1943–2010), American trumpeter
Spike Davis (born 1990), American rugby union footballer
Spud Davis (1904–1984), American baseball player
S. S. Davis (1817–1896), American politician
Stanton Davis (born 1945), American trumpeter
Steph Davis (born 1973), American rock climber
Sterling Davis (born 1977), American basketball player
Steven Davis (born 1985), Northern Irish footballer who holds the record for most caps for his national team
Storm Davis (born 1961), American baseball player
Stringer Davis (1899–1973), British actor
Stu Davis (1921–2007), Canadian singer
Sylleste Davis (born 1961), American politician

T
TJ Davis (born 1968), British singer
Tae Davis (born 1996), American football player
Talmadge Davis (1962–2005), American native artist
Tamara Davis, Australian astrophysicist
Tamari Davis (born 2003), American sprinter
Tammy Davis, New Zealand actor
Tamra Davis (born 1962), American film director
Tanard Davis (born 1983), American football player
Tania Davis (born 1975), British-Australian violinist
Tanita S. Davis, American author
Tanya Davis, Canadian singer-songwriter
Tanya Davis (artist), American artist
Tanyalee Davis (born 1970), Canadian-American comedian
Tara Davis (born 1999), American athlete
T. Cullen Davis (born 1933), American entrepreneur
Te Ahu Davis (born 1985), New Zealand cricketer
Te Aue Davis (1925–2010), New Zealand native weaver
Teddy Davis (1923–1966), American boxer
Tenika Davis (born 1985), Canadian actress
Teo Davis (born 1951), American writer
Teófilo Davis (born 1929), Venezuelan hurdler
Terence Davis (born 1997), American basketball player
Terrell Davis (born 1972), American football player
Terril Davis (born 1968), American runner
Thabiti Davis (born 1975), American football player
Thornetta Davis (born 1963), American singer
Thulani Davis (born 1949), American playwright
Tina Davis (born 1960), American politician
Tiny Davis (1909/1910–1994), American trumpeter
Titus Davis (1993–2020), American football player
Tobé Coller Davis (1888–1962), American columnist
Toby Davis, British racing driver
Tod Davis (1924–1978), American baseball player
Torrey Davis (born 1988), American football player
Tracey Davis (born 1977), Australian swimmer
Tracie Davis (born 1970), American politician
Tracy Davis (born 1962), Australian politician
Travis Davis (born 1973), American football player
Tres Davis (born 1982), American tennis player
Trevor Davis (born 1993), American football player
Trisha Davis (born 1954), American biochemist
Tristan Davis (born 1986), American football player
Tyree Davis (born 1970), American football player
Tyrell Davis (1902–1970), British actor

U
Ulysses Davis (1872–1924), American film director
Ulysses Davis (artist) (1913–1990), American sculptor
Uri Davis (born 1943), Israeli-Palestinian academic

V
Vaginal Davis (born 1969), American drag queen
Van Davis (1921–1987), American football player
Varina Davis (1826–1906), American social figure
Varina Anne Davis (1864–1898), American author
Vera Gilbride Davis (1894–1974), American politician
Vern Davis (born 1949), American football player
Vernon Davis (born 1984), American football player
Vernon M. Davis (1855–1932), American lawyer
Vicky Davis (1925–2006), American fashion designer
Victor Davis (1964–1989), Canadian swimmer
Victor Davis (footballer) (1902–1981), Australian rules footballer
Victoria Davis, Bermudian footballer
Vincent Davis, American politician
Viola Davis (born 1965), American actress
Virgil L. Davis Jr. (born 1960), American record producer
Virginia Davis (1918–2009), American actress
Viveka Davis (born 1969), American actress
Volney Davis (1902–1982), American bank robber

W
Waana Morrell Davis (??–2019), New Zealand teacher
Wallace Davis, American football player
Wallace Ray Davis (1949–2007), American televangelist
Walt Davis (1931–2020), American athlete
Wantha Davis (1917–2012), American jockey
Warwick Davis (born 1970), British actor
Watson Davis (1896–1967), American entrepreneur
Webster Davis (1861–1923), American politician
Wee Willie Davis (1906–1981), American actor
Wendell Davis (born 1966), American football player
Wendell Davis (cornerback) (born 1973), American football player
Westmoreland Davis (1859–1942), American lawyer and politician
W. Eugene Davis (born 1936), American judge
W. Harry Davis (1923–2006), American activist
Whitney Davis (born 1958), American writer
Wild Bill Davis (1918–1995), American pianist
Wilton Davis (1929–2004), American football player
W. Kenneth Davis (1918–2005), American chemist
W. Lester Davis (died 1978), American politician and businessman
W. True Davis Jr. (1919–2003), American businessman
W. Turner Davis (1901–1988), American politician
Wyatt Davis (born 1999), American football player

X
Xavier Davis (born 1971), American pianist

Y
Yvonne Davis (born 1955), American politician

Z
Zachary Taylor Davis (1869–1946), American architect
Zeinabu irene Davis (born 1961), American filmmaker
Zelma Davis (born 1970), Liberian singer
Zola Davis (born 1975), American football player

Disambiguation pages

A
Aaron Davis (disambiguation)
Adam Davis (disambiguation)
Adrian Davis (disambiguation)
A. J. Davis (disambiguation)
Al Davis (disambiguation)
Alan Davis (disambiguation)
Alex Davis (disambiguation)
Alexander Davis (disambiguation)
Alexis Davis (disambiguation)
Alice Davis (disambiguation)
Allan Davis (disambiguation)
Allen Davis (disambiguation)
Allison Davis (disambiguation)
Amanda Davis (disambiguation)
Andre Davis (disambiguation)
Andrew Davis (disambiguation)
Angela Davis (disambiguation)
Ann Davis (disambiguation)
Anthony Davis (disambiguation)
Arthur Davis (disambiguation)
Austin Davis (disambiguation)

B
Barry Davis (disambiguation)
Ben Davis (disambiguation)
Bernard Davis (disambiguation)
Bert Davis (disambiguation)
Betty Davis (disambiguation)
Bill Davis (disambiguation)
Billy Davis (disambiguation)
Blake Davis (disambiguation)
Bob Davis (disambiguation)
Brad Davis (disambiguation)
Brian Davis (disambiguation)
Brooke Davis (disambiguation)
Bruce Davis (disambiguation)
Buster Davis (disambiguation)
Butch Davis (disambiguation)
Bryan Davis (disambiguation)

C
Cameron Davis (disambiguation)
Carl Davis (disambiguation)
Carlos Davis (disambiguation)
Carol Davis (disambiguation)
Chad Davis (disambiguation)
Charles Davis (disambiguation)
Chris Davis (disambiguation)
Christina Davis (disambiguation)
Chuck Davis (disambiguation)
Clark Davis (disambiguation)
Clifford Davis (disambiguation)
Clive Davis (disambiguation)
Colin Davis (disambiguation)
Corey Davis (disambiguation)
Craig Davis (disambiguation)

D
Dale Davis (disambiguation)
Daniel Davis (disambiguation)
Darren Davis (disambiguation)
David Davis (disambiguation)
Deborah Davis (disambiguation)
Del Davis (disambiguation)
Dennis Davis (disambiguation)
Derek Davis (disambiguation)
Devin Davis (disambiguation)
Diana Davis (disambiguation)
Dick Davis (disambiguation)
Dickie Davis (disambiguation)
Donald Davis (disambiguation)
Dorothy Davis (disambiguation)
Doug Davis (disambiguation)
Dwight Davis (disambiguation)

E
Edgar Davis (disambiguation)
Edith Davis (disambiguation)
Edmund Davis (disambiguation)
Edward Davis (disambiguation)
Edwin Davis (disambiguation)
E. J. Davis (disambiguation)
Elizabeth Davis (disambiguation)
Ellen Davis (disambiguation)
Elliot Davis (disambiguation)
Elwood Davis (disambiguation)
Emmett Davis (disambiguation)
Eric Davis (disambiguation)
Ethel Davis (disambiguation)
Eugene Davis (disambiguation)
Evan Davis (disambiguation)

F
Francis Davis (disambiguation)
Frank Davis (disambiguation)
Franklin Davis (disambiguation)
Fred Davis (disambiguation)

G
Gary Davis (disambiguation)
Gene Davis (disambiguation)
Geoff Davis (disambiguation)
George Davis (disambiguation)
Gerald Davis (disambiguation)
Gerry Davis (disambiguation)
Gladys Davis (disambiguation)
Glen Davis (disambiguation)
Glenn Davis (disambiguation)
Gloria Davis (disambiguation)
Graeme Davis (disambiguation)
Greg Davis (disambiguation)
Guy Davis (disambiguation)

H
Hannah Davis (disambiguation)
Harold Davis (disambiguation)
Harry Davis (disambiguation)
Henrietta Davis (disambiguation)
Henry Davis (disambiguation)
Herbert Davis (disambiguation)
Howard Davis (disambiguation)
Hubert Davis (disambiguation)

I
Ian Davis (disambiguation)
Ira Davis (disambiguation)
Isaac Davis (disambiguation)

J
Jack Davis (disambiguation)
Jackie Davis (disambiguation)
Jackson Davis (disambiguation)
Jacob Davis (disambiguation)
Jake Davis (disambiguation)
James Davis (disambiguation)
Jamie Davis (disambiguation)
Jason Davis (disambiguation)
Jeff Davis (disambiguation)
Jefferson Davis (disambiguation)
Jerome Davis (disambiguation)
Jerry Davis (disambiguation)
Jesse Davis (disambiguation)
Jim Davis (disambiguation)
Jimmy Davis (disambiguation)
Jo Davis (disambiguation)
Joe Davis (disambiguation)
John Davis (disambiguation)
Johnathan Davis (disambiguation)
Johnny Davis (disambiguation)
Jon Davis (disambiguation)
Jonathan Davis (disambiguation)
Jordan Davis (disambiguation)
Joseph Davis (disambiguation)
Joshua Davis (disambiguation)
Julia Davis (disambiguation)
Justin Davis (disambiguation)

K
Karen Davis (disambiguation)
Katherine Davis (disambiguation)
Kathryn Davis (disambiguation)
Katie Davis (disambiguation)
Keith Davis (disambiguation)
Kelvin Davis (disambiguation)
Kenneth Davis (disambiguation)
Kevin Davis (disambiguation)
Kim Davis (disambiguation)
Kyle Davis (disambiguation)

L
Larry Davis (disambiguation)
Laura Davis (disambiguation)
Liam Davis (disambiguation)
Lindsay Davis (disambiguation)
Lisa Davis (disambiguation)
Leon Davis (disambiguation)
Leonard Davis (disambiguation)
Leslie Davis (disambiguation)
Louis Davis (disambiguation)
Lynn Davis (disambiguation)

M
Marc Davis (disambiguation)
Marion Davis (disambiguation)
Mark Davis (disambiguation)
Marlon Davis (disambiguation)
Martha Davis (disambiguation)
Martin Davis (disambiguation)
Mary Davis (disambiguation)
Matthew Davis (disambiguation)
Maurice Davis (disambiguation)
Michael Davis (disambiguation)
Michelle Davis (disambiguation)

N
Nancy Davis (disambiguation)
Natalie Davis (disambiguation)
Nate Davis (disambiguation)
Nathan Davis (disambiguation)
Nathaniel Davis (disambiguation)
Ned Davis (disambiguation)
Neil Davis (disambiguation)
Nelson Davis (disambiguation)
Nick Davis (disambiguation)
Noah Davis (disambiguation)
Norman Davis (disambiguation)

O
Oliver Davis (disambiguation)
Oscar Davis (disambiguation)

P
Pamela Davis (disambiguation)
Patrick Davis (disambiguation)
Paul Davis (disambiguation)
Pauline Davis (disambiguation)
Percy Davis (disambiguation)
Peter Davis (disambiguation)
Philip Davis (disambiguation)
Preston Davis (disambiguation)

Q
Quincy Davis (disambiguation)

R
Rachel Davis (disambiguation)
Ralph Davis (disambiguation)
Raymond Davis (disambiguation)
Rebecca Davis (disambiguation)
Red Davis (disambiguation)
Reginald Davis (disambiguation)
Reuben Davis (disambiguation)
Richard Davis (disambiguation)
Rob Davis (disambiguation)
Robert Davis (disambiguation)
Rod Davis (disambiguation)
Rodney Davis (disambiguation)
Roger Davis (disambiguation)
Ronald Davis (disambiguation)
Ross Davis (disambiguation)
Roy Davis (disambiguation)
Russell Davis (disambiguation)
Ruth Davis (disambiguation)
Ryan Davis (disambiguation)

S
Sam Davis (disambiguation)
Sammy Davis (disambiguation)
Samuel Davis (disambiguation)
Sarah Davis (disambiguation)
Scott Davis (disambiguation)
Sean Davis (disambiguation)
Sharon Davis (disambiguation)
Shelby Davis (disambiguation)
Simon Davis (disambiguation)
Spencer Davis (disambiguation)
Stan Davis (disambiguation)
Stephanie Davis (disambiguation)
Stephen Davis (disambiguation)
Steve Davis (disambiguation)
Stuart Davis (disambiguation)
Susan Davis (disambiguation)
Suzanne Davis (disambiguation)
Sydney Davis (disambiguation)

T
Taylor Davis (disambiguation)
Ted Davis (disambiguation)
Terry Davis (disambiguation)
Theodore Davis (disambiguation)
Thomas Davis (disambiguation)
Tim Davis (disambiguation)
Todd Davis (disambiguation)
Tony Davis (disambiguation)
Troy Davis (disambiguation)
Tyler Davis (disambiguation)
Tyrone Davis (disambiguation)

V
Vanessa Davis (disambiguation)

W
Wade Davis (disambiguation)
Walter Davis (disambiguation)
Warren Davis (disambiguation)
Wayne Davis (disambiguation)
Wendy Davis (disambiguation)
William Davis (disambiguation)
Willie Davis (disambiguation)
Willis Davis (disambiguation)
Winston Davis (disambiguation)

Fictional characters
Clay Davis, a character in the drama series The Wire
Kristina Davis, a character in the soap opera General Hospital
Llewyn Davis, a character in the film Inside Llewyn Davis

See also
Admiral Davis (disambiguation), a disambiguation page for Admirals surnamed "Davis"
Attorney General Davis (disambiguation), a disambiguation page for Attorneys General surnamed "Davis"
Governor Davis (disambiguation), a disambiguation page for Governors surnamed "Davis"
Justice Davis (disambiguation), a disambiguation page for Justices surnamed "Davis"
Senator Davis (disambiguation), a disambiguation page for Senators surnamed "Davis"

Lists of people by surname
Surnames